John Roper may refer to:

John Roper, 1st Baron Teynham (died 1618), English nobleman
John Roper, Baron Roper (1935–2016), British politician
John Roper (American football) (born 1965), former American football linebacker
John Roper (baseball) (born 1971), Major League Baseball pitcher
John Roper (British diplomat), former British ambassador to Luxembourg
John Roper (explorer) (c. 1822–1895), Australian explorer; namesake of Roper Peak and Roper River in the Northern Territory
John Herbert Roper, American historian and author a
John W. Roper (1898–1963), Vice Admiral in the United States Navy
John Charles Roper (1858–1940), Anglican bishop